"Dimãndarea pãrinteascã", also known as "Pãrinteasca dimãndari", is an Aromanian poem written in 1888 exhorting parents to teach their children the language, instead of assimilating into other Balkan ethnicities. As a result it is often used as a national anthem by some Aromanians.

History
The anthem was written in 1888 in Bucharest by an Aromanian poet, Constantin Belimace.

Lyrics

References

External links

1888 songs
Aromanian music
Aromanian symbols